is a Japanese light novel series written by Kumanano and illustrated by 029. It began serialization online in 2014 on the user-generated novel publishing website Shōsetsuka ni Narō. It was later acquired by Shufu to Seikatsu Sha, who have published nineteen volumes since May 2015 under their PASH! Books imprint. 

A manga adaptation with art by Sergei has been serialized online via Shufu to Seikatsu Sha's Comic PASH! website since 2018 and has been collected in eight tankōbon volumes. Both the light novel and manga are licensed in North America by Seven Seas Entertainment. An anime television series adaptation by EMT Squared aired from October to December 2020. A second season is set to premiere in April 2023.

Premise
Yuna is a bored teenage girl who spends her time as a NEET and living off money she makes in the stock market, being mooched off by her parents. While playing her favorite FPV online game World Fantasy Online, Yuna receives an embarrassing bear suit as a gift for playing so long. The administrator of the game turns out to be a God, who based the game on her world. She then transports Yuna into said world without a real warning with the bear suit, which she is powerless without. Despite her initial anger at being teleported without consent, Yuna quickly adapts and finds her new life more fulfilling than the empty one back on Earth.

Characters

Yuna is a 15-year-old girl who lives by herself. Given her finances, she chose to become socially withdrawn at age twelve to play World Fantasy Online as much as possible. She decides to enjoy her new life in another world since she did not have any reason to go back to her original world, though she loathes the fact God made all her powers be linked to an embarrassing bear suit. She has to use bear imagery with her magic to make it strong. To her frustrated resignation, Yuna finds everyone uses the motif of her suit for things associated with Yuna.

Fina is a 10-year-old girl and a resident of the town of Crimonia. Having been forced to care for the family at a very young age, she is very responsible and mature. As noted by her mother and Yuna, Fina has an unusual mentality for a 10-year-old. She met Yuna after she rescued her from wolves and later became her work partner. Thanks to Yuna have a ridiculously large amount of monsters for her to harvest, courtesy of her item bag, Fina is no longer hurting for money. As such, Fina gets 50% of all sales for the harvested items. Her closeness to Yuna shows Fina thinks of her as family.

Noire is a 10-year-old girl and noble who resides in the town of Crimonia; she met Yuna after hearing reports of her from the adventurers guild. She has an older sister named Shia Foschurose. She loves Yuna's bears more than anything; having founded the Miss Bear Fan Club in appreciation. Her nickname is "Noa".

Shuri is Fina's younger sister and daughter of Telmina. Shuri is often makes silly assumptions.

Misana is Gran Farrengram's granddaughter. Her nickname is "Misa".

Shia is a 15-year-old girl who is Noire's elder sister and the daughter of Cliff and Eleanora Foschurose. She currently lives together with her mother in the Royal Capital and attends the Royal Academy, while her sister and father live together in Crimonia. Shia takes after her father most; being able to mask her emotions.

Cliff is the feudal lord of Crimonia. He is, according to Yuna, a lord who takes good care of everyone in his domain, including the orphanage. In fact, he is swift with cutting the corruption out of his territory; having been angered at the news a subordinate embezzled funds, and quickly tried to make ammends to the victims.

Gentz is a Guild staff member and a resident of Crimonia. He later becomes Fina and Shuri's stepfather. In his adventuring days, he belonged to Telmina and Roy's party.

Yuna's summoned Beast along with Kumayuru. It is the white one out of the two bears she summons. The name means "Hugging Bear".

Yuna's summoned Beast along with Kumakyū. It is the black one out of the two bears she summons. The name means "Spinning Bear".

Telmina is the mother of Fina and Shuri and a resident of Crimonia. She is a former adventurer, but wasn't allowed to resume her old job by her daughters. She is a caring and motherly figure and has lived in poverty for many years. She holds a great love for her family and her benefactor Yuna and feels forever grateful towards her. She later becomes the orphanage's business representative.

Lala is a maid at the Foschurose residence.

Eleanora Foschurose is a 33-year-old noble residing in the Royal Capital, and the mother of Noire and Shia and the wife of Cliff Foschurose. She currently lives together in the Royal Capital with Shia, working as the King's adviser; while Noire and Cliff live together in Crimonia. Yuna notes Eleanora basically runs the kingdom, as the king relies on her so much. Even though she is in her early thirties, Yuna describes her as someone who only looks like she is in her twenties. Aside from that, Eleanora is famous for her beauty.

Roy is Telmina's deceased husband. Gentz, Telmina and him were in the same adventurer party before he and Telmina got married.

 
Sanya is the guildmaster of adventurer's guild residing in the royal capital. She is an elf and has a little sister named Ruimin and a little brother named Luca.

Gran is the grandfather of Misana Farrengram. He is the feudal lord of the eastern part of the town of Sheelin. Later, he governs all of Sheelin after the Salbert family, who formerly governed the western part of Sheelin, were stripped of their noble status after becoming involved in a kidnapping incident among other crimes.

Atla is the guildmaster of the adventurer's guild in Millela. Because Atla dresses in a short skirt and top that exposes her garments underneath, Yuna mistook her for an exhibitionist and the Guild for an adult business.

Flora is the princess of the kingdom. She is very fond of Yuna, whom created a storybook for Flora that actually was age appropriate.

Bō is the headmistress for the orphanage in Crimonia.

Liz is the staff and instructor for the children at the orphanage in Crimonia.

Rondo is the butler at the Foschurose residence.

Media

Light novels
The series was first published online on the Shōsetsuka ni Narō website in October 2014 by Kumanano. It was later acquired by Shufu to Seikatsu Sha, who published the first volume as a light novel under their PASH! Books imprint in May 2015. The series is licensed in North America by Seven Seas Entertainment.

Manga
A manga adaptation with art by Sergei began serialization online via Shufu to Seikatsu Sha's Comic PASH! website on March 28, 2018. It has been collected in nine tankōbon volumes as of November 2022. The manga is also licensed in North America by Seven Seas Entertainment.

A spinoff manga series by Yukinori Satō, titled , began serialization online via Shufu to Seikatsu Sha's PASH UP! website on September 16, 2020.

Volume list

Kuma Kuma Kuma Bear

Kuma Kuma Kuma Beā 〜 Kyō mo Kuma Kuma Biyori 〜

Anime
In January 2020, an anime television series adaptation was announced in the fourteenth volume of the light novel. The series was animated by EMT Squared and directed by Yuu Nobuta, with Takashi Aoshima handling series composition, Yuki Nakano designing the characters, and Shigeo Komori composing the music. Hisashii Ishii served as series director. The series ran for 12 episodes from October 7 to December 23, 2020 on AT-X and other networks. Azumi Waki performed the opening theme . Maki Kawase performed the first ending theme  from Episodes 2–11, while Kawase and Waki also performed the second ending theme  for Episode 12. 

Funimation acquired the series and streamed it on its website in North America and the British Isles. On January 19, 2021, Funimation announced the series would receive an English dub, which premiered the following day. Following Sony's acquisition of Crunchyroll, the series was moved to Crunchyroll.

On December 23, 2020, when the first season's finale aired, the production of a second season was announced. The main cast and staff are returning from the first season. Titled Kuma Kuma Kuma Bear Punch!, the season is set to premiere on April 3, 2023. Azumi Waki will perform the opening theme , while Maki Kawase will perform the ending theme .

Notes

References

External links
  at Shōsetsuka ni Narō 
  
  
  
 

2015 Japanese novels
Anime and manga based on light novels
AT-X (TV network) original programming
Comedy anime and manga
Crunchyroll anime
EMT Squared
Isekai anime and manga
Isekai novels and light novels
Iyashikei anime and manga
Japanese webcomics
Light novels
Light novels first published online
Seinen manga
Seven Seas Entertainment titles
Shōsetsuka ni Narō
Upcoming anime television series
Webcomics in print